Line and Space is an architectural design firm founded in 1978, by Les Wallach, FAIA, and headquartered in Tucson, Arizona.  They have completed projects internationally and are known for their ecologically-sound buildings.

In 2007 Line and Space extended its services internationally when the company was selected to design a series of luxury villas in Shenzhen, China. The project included the design of several housing prototypes, a corporate retreat, and community center along the hillside of Tianqin Bay. The “Cascading Residences” as they have come to be known, were a catalyst for the firm’s future work in China. Since then, Line and Space has completed projects in the cities of Xiamen, Kunming, Chongqing, and Nanjing. As the scope of their work continues to broaden, Line and Space consistently strives to create sustainable, resource conserving architecture that is inherent to their design philosophy.

Projects 

Boyce Thompson Arboretum State Park Visitor Center, Superior, Arizona (1988)
The Arroyo House, Tucson, Arizona (1989)
Arizona-Sonora Desert Museum Restaurant and Gallery Complex, Tucson, Arizona (1993)
National Historic Trails Interpretive Center, Casper, Wyoming (2002)
Cesar Chavez Regional Library, Phoenix, Arizona (2007
University of Arizona Poetry Center, Tucson, Arizona (2007)
Red Rock Canyon Visitor Center, Red Rock Canyon National Conservation Area outside of Las Vegas, Nevada, (2010)
Cascading Residences, Tianqin Bay, Shenzhen, China, (2013)
San Diego National Wildlife Refuge Complex, Chula Vista, California (2011)
The Two, Xiamen, China (2011)
Liangjiang Golf Club, Chongqing, China (2016)
Pima Animal Care Center Expansion and Remodel, Tucson, Arizona (2017)

Awards 

The Committee on the Environment (COTE) Top Ten Award for the Boyce Thompson Arboretum (1991)
Recipient of six-state AIA Western Mountain Region Firm of the Year Award (1999)
The Committee on the Environment (COTE) Top Ten Award for the Cesar Chavez Regional Library (2008)
AIA Arizona, Sustainable Firm of the Year (2009)
$25,000 First Prize Award from the National Endowment for the Arts for Skymarkers, a Gateway to Tucson, Arizona. 
Named New Landmark Libraries by the publication Library Journal for the Cesar Chavez Regional Library (2011) and the University of Arizona Poetry Center (2012)
International Award in American Architecture from the European Centre for Architecture, Art, Design, and Urban Studies and the Chicago Athenaeum for the Red Rock Canyon Visitor Center (2012)
International Green Project Award from the Russian Union of Architects, Grand Prize (2012)
AIA Arizona SRP Sustainable Design Award for the Red Rock Canyon Visitor Center (2011)
AIA Arizona Firm of the Year Award (2011)
AIA Arizona, Twenty Five Year Award for the Boyce Thompson Arboretum (2014)
AIA Arizona, Twenty Five Year Award for The Arroyo House (2015)

References

External links 
Line and Space Official Website

Architecture firms based in Arizona